Harry Richard Sheppard (January 10, 1885 – April 28, 1969) was an American businessman and politician who served as a U.S. representative from California from 1937 to 1965,

Biography 
Born in Mobile, Alabama, Sheppard attended the public schools.
He studied law.
He was employed in transportation department of the Santa Fe Railroad.

He was an active committee member of the Brotherhood of Railroad Trainmen.
He engaged in the copper business in Alaska.
He served as president and general manager of King's Beverage and King's Laboratories Corps. of California until 1934.

Congress 
Sheppard was elected as a Democrat to the Seventy-fifth and to the thirteen succeeding Congresses (January 3, 1937 – January 3, 1965).
He was not a candidate for renomination in 1964 to the Eighty-ninth Congress.

Death
He died in Washington, D.C., April 28, 1969.
He was interred in National Memorial Park, Falls Church, Virginia.

References

External links
 

1885 births
1969 deaths
Democratic Party members of the United States House of Representatives from California
20th-century American politicians
Brotherhood of Railroad Trainmen people
Trade unionists from California